Józef Jan Gosławski (24 April 1908 – 23 January 1963) was a Polish sculptor and medallic artist. He was a designer of coins (e.g. 5 zł with fisherman), monuments (e.g. Frédéric Chopin in Żelazowa Wola) and medals (e.g. Year 1939). Laureate of many artistic competitions; decorated with the Silver Cross of Merit.

Biography 

Józef Gosławski was born in Polanówka, in the Lublin Governorate of Congress Poland, but was brought up Wąwolnica with his parents, two brothers (including younger brother Stanisław Gosławski, who also became a sculptor) and two sisters. He began his artistic education in the Building Crafts School founded by Jan Koszczyc-Witkiewicz in Kazimierz Dolny. After finishing at this school, he passed an exam to the Academy of Fine Arts in Kraków, but he was too young to begin studies. He continued his education in the National Decorative Arts and Artistic Industry School in Kraków. He was influenced by Stanisław Szukalski, but he wasn't a member of the Horned Heart Tribe.

In 1932, he finally began studies at the Academy of Fine Arts in Kraków, where he was taught by professor Xawery Dunikowski. Then he moved to Warsaw, where he was taught by professor Tadeusz Breyer. He was awarded a scholarship to study in Rome, where he graduated from the Royal Academy of Fine Arts in 1937 (he was taught by Angelo Zanelli). During his stay in the Italy, which ended in 1939, he took part in exhibitions of the Kapitol – a society of Polish artists. He also served as the society's vice chairman.

He returned to Poland in July 1939 to become a conservator of the Royal Castle in Warsaw. He did not fill this position due to the beginning of the Second World War. He spent the occupation years in Wąwolnica. After the end of the war, he renovated, among others, a 17th-century house under St. Nicolaus in Kazimierz Dolny.

He held the Medal and Metal Sculpture Chair in the National Artistic School in Poznań from 1947, and was the chairman of Poznań district of the Association of Polish Artists and Designers (ZPAP) for two terms of office. Married to his student Wanda Mankin in 1948, he had two daughters: Bożena Stefania and Maria Anna. He moved with his family to Warsaw in 1956, where he became a chairman of Sculpture Department of ZPAP central board. He died suddenly in Warsaw in 1963 at the beginning of a new artistic phase.

Art 

Józef Gosławski was the creator of numerous monuments and portrait sculptures, sculpture caricatures, medals, coins, renovations and drawings. His early works, generally not conserved, show some influence of cubism (Self-portrait - 1932–1933, Portrait of Witold Chomicz - 1927–1928), Szukalski's ideas (sculpture caricature of Henryk Uziembło), as well as forms similar to ideas of the Polish Applied Art Society (design of the St. Franciscus altar). His stay in Italy and a direct contact with its art changed Gosławski's point of view – the portraits of Robert, Maria Maro, and the Sicilian show a strong influence from his antique studies. This influence, combined with the Italian Renaissance impact, are also seen in the early medals and plaques created in Rome. The before-war works were nearly completely lost during their way back to Poland in August 1939 (there is a relation, whose author says about possibility of staying a part of works in Castello del Catajo).

The years of Second World War were not lost in the terms of artistic activity. War conditions forced him to interest in small sculpture forms. The medals created in those years were mainly related to the martyrdom of the Polish nation.

After the war he continued his work in the field of medals. He was a precursor of the withdrawal from classic form and shape of medals. He became a lonely connection of the Konstanty Laszczka and Józef Aumiller generation with later medallists. His strong position in medallic arts is confirmed with numerous awards and purchases of his works to museums in Poland (e.g. Warsaw, Wrocław, Kraków, Lublin, Toruń) and in Europe (e.g. Prague, Athens, Budapest, Rome, Vatican City, Paris, The Hague, Moscow, Sankt Petersburg).

He returned to the monumental sculpture with the Adam Mickiewicz monument in Gorzów Wielkopolski, the Never war monument in Żabikowo (district of Luboń) near Poznań, a sculpture group called Music in Warsaw (MDM), and the Frédéric Chopin monument in Żelazowa Wola. He participated and won numerous contests for monument design, e.g. Heroes of Warsaw, Soldiers of I Army of People's Army of Poland and Bolesław Prus. He also created a monumental altar of the Transfiguration of Jesus in Masłów near Kielce.

Józef Gosławski's works are difficult to classify. Constant prospecting and an artistic anxiety lead him to create in the different forms and materials. But the main focus of his art was always a human being - as a hero and in everyday life. Gosławski was modest and friendly, even his caricatures, the art type very rare among sculptors, are featured with benignant sense of humour rather than malice.

He was honoured with 14 individual exhibitions, and his works were presented on over 60 domestic (in Poland) and over 20 abroad exhibitions.

Participation in artistic competitions

List of solo exhibits

Selected group exhibits

Domestic

External

Inspirations 
The memory of Józef Gosławski and his works, especially medals, is remembered not only on the occasion of exhibitions. In December 2008 Polish Mint emitted local currency of Lidzbark Warmiński. It was a ducat Four men (Polish: Czterech mężów) whose observe based on Gosławski's medal Lidzbark Warmiński - The City of Great Men (Polish: Lidzbark Warmiński - miasto mężów znakomitych). In 2009 The Polish Mint produced a medal series Famous Medallists dedicated to Józef Gosławski. In this set there was, among others, the medal based on project made during Second World war, entitled Year 1939 - it was the first public presentation of it. The second medal (by Hanna Jelonek) presented an image of the artist (obverse) and Chopin's monument by Gosławski (reverse). In 2009 there was also an emission of silver and gold replica of 5 zł with fisherman coin, which was designed to the competition in 1958. Moreover, there is the one street dedicated to Józef Gosławski - it is located in Wąwolnica - the village where the artists lived and created many works for years.

Gallery

References

Bibliography

External links 

 
 
 
 
 
 
 

1908 births
1963 deaths
People from Opole Lubelskie County
People from Lublin Governorate
Modern sculptors
Polish caricaturists
20th-century medallists
20th-century Polish sculptors
Polish male sculptors
20th-century male artists
Burials at Powązki Cemetery